Roku (also Romanized as Rokū; also known as Row Kūh and Rūd Kūh) is a village in Chubar Rural District, Haviq District, Talesh County, Gilan Province, Iran. At the 2006 census, its population was 258, in 58 families.

References 

Populated places in Talesh County